German submarine U-502 was a Type IXC U-boat of Nazi Germany's Kriegsmarine during World War II. The submarine was laid down on 2 April 1940 at the Deutsche Werft yard in Hamburg with yard number 292, launched on 18 February 1941 and commissioned on 31 May under the command of Kapitänleutnant Jürgen von Rosenstiel.

She began her service life under training with the 2nd U-boat Flotilla between 31 May and 1 September 1941 before moving on to operations, also with the 2nd flotilla. U-502 sank fourteen Allied vessels between September 1941 and July 1942 before she was sunk by a British aircraft in the Bay of Biscay on 6 July 1942.

Design
German Type IXC submarines were slightly larger than the original Type IXBs. U-502 had a displacement of  when at the surface and  while submerged. She had two shafts and two  propellers.

U-502 was fitted with six  torpedo tubes (four fitted at the bow and two at the stern), 22 torpedoes, one  SK C/32 naval gun, 180 rounds, and a  SK C/30 as well as a  C/30 anti-aircraft gun. The boat had a complement of forty-eight.

Service history

First patrol
U-502 departed Kiel on 29 September 1941, and ventured out into the mid-Atlantic.
On 7 October, south of Iceland, she torpedoed the 14,795 GRT British ship Svend Foyn, a straggler from Convoy HX 152 en route from New York to Liverpool, carrying fuel oil and aircraft and tanks as deck cargo.
U-502 arrived in Lorient in occupied France on 9 November.

Second patrol
U-502 sailed from Lorient on 18 December 1941, but aborted her patrol, having barely left the Bay of Biscay and returned to her French base on the 22nd.

Third patrol
U-502s next patrol began on 19 January 1942. She sailed for the Caribbean waters north of Venezuela to attack the vital oil trade.

On the morning of 16 February off the Gulf of Venezuela she torpedoed and sank three tankers in as many hours; the British 2,395 GRT Tia Juana,
the Venezuelan 2,650 GRT Monagas,
and then the British 2,391 GRT San Nicolas.

U-502 struck again on 22 February near Aruba, sinking the American 9,033 GRT tanker J.N. Pew with torpedoes during the night,
then the Panamanian 8,329 GRT Thalia with torpedoes and shell-fire that morning.
That afternoon she badly damaged the American 9,002 GRT Sun with a single torpedo. The crew initially abandoned ship, but later re-boarded and managed to take her into Aruba to make repairs.
The U-boat returned to Lorient on 16 March after 57 days at sea.

Fourth patrol
Her fourth and final patrol was her most productive. Sailing from Lorient on 22 April 1942, she resumed her predations in the Caribbean Sea.

Her first success came on 11 May, northeast of the Virgin Islands, where she sank the unescorted British 4,963 GRT cargo ship Cape of Good Hope with torpedoes and shell-fire.

She mistakenly sank the unescorted and neutral 4,996 GRT Brazilian merchant ship Gonçalves Dias with two torpedoes about 100 miles south of Ciudad Trujillo on 24 May. The ship was identified as Brazilian only after the attack when the survivors were questioned.
On 28 May, about 150 miles south of the Mona Passage, she sank the unescorted American 6,759 GRT Type C1 ship Alcoa Pilgrim, carrying a cargo of bauxite ore,
and on 3 June, about 150 miles north-west of Trinidad, she torpedoed the unescorted American 6,940 GRT tanker M.F. Elliott. Hit below the waterline, the ship sank within six minutes.

U-502 attacked Convoy TO-5, en route from Trinidad to Curaçao, on 9 June, about 35 miles north-east of Cape Blanco, Venezuela, sinking the Belgian 5,085 GRT merchant ship Bruxelles,

On 15 June, U-502 struck once again and sank three ships in a single day. The first, at 01:00, was the unescorted American 8,001 GRT merchant ship Scottsburg, hit by two torpedoes about 90 miles west of Grenada.
At 04:10, about 100 miles north-west of Trinidad, she sank the unescorted Panamanian 5,010 GRT Hog Islander Cold Harbor, carrying a cargo of tanks, aircraft and ammunition, with two torpedoes. The first torpedo struck the starboard side causing the ammunition in No.2 hold to explode. About 30 minutes later, a second torpedo struck the port side and the ship sank after 15 minutes.
Finally, at 20:15 about 30 miles west of Grenada, she sank the unescorted American 5,702 GRT ship West Hardaway with a spread of three torpedoes. Two missed, passing ahead and astern, but the third struck the starboard bow. The ship's Navy Armed Guard returned fire (the ship was armed with a  gun, four 20 mm guns, and two .30 calibre machine guns), but the ship was hit by another torpedo and sank an hour later. All hands abandoned ship and survived.

Sinking
U-502 then headed for her base, but at 04:45 on 6 July in the Bay of Biscay, west of La Rochelle, at position , she was sunk by depth charges dropped by a Leigh light-equipped Wellington bomber of No. 172 Squadron RAF. All 52 hands were lost. This was the first confirmed kill using a Leigh light. The pilot of the aircraft P/O Wiley B. Howell, an American volunteer serving in the RAF, was subsequently awarded the DFC.
Howell later returned to serve in the United States Navy, commanding the carrier  in 1965–66.

Wolfpacks
U-502 took part in one wolfpack, namely:
 Reissewolf (21 – 30 October 1941)

Summary of raiding history

References

Bibliography

External links

German Type IX submarines
U-boats commissioned in 1941
U-boats sunk in 1942
U-boats sunk by depth charges
U-boats sunk by British aircraft
World War II submarines of Germany
Shipwrecks in the Bay of Biscay
World War II shipwrecks in the Atlantic Ocean
1941 ships
Ships built in Hamburg
Ships lost with all hands
Maritime incidents in July 1942